The Château de La Vérie, also known as the Logis de La Vérie, is a château in Challans, Vendée, France. It was built in the 17th century. It has been listed as an official historical monument since 1964.

References

Houses completed in the 17th century
Châteaux in Vendée